Robert "Shoofly" Shufelt (born February 16, 1935) is an American artist who is primarily known for his depiction of the modern-day cowboy and Ranch lifestyle in the Southwest. Originally from Illinois, he attended art school and worked in illustration before moving to a cattle ranch near Wickenburg, Arizona. As of 1991, he lives in New Mexico.

Career 
Shufelt's Pencil graphite drawings capture ranching culture which is absorbed in the cowboy way. Some drawings have been published by the artist in small editions of stone, offset or digital issues.

In 2014 he was awarded the New Mexico Governor's Awards for Excellence in the Arts alongside author George R. R. Martin.

Shufelt's artwork has been represented in galleries in Scottsdale, Arizona; Jackson, Wyoming; and Tucson, Arizona. His art has been exhibited in museums across the United States including the Desert Caballeros Western Museum; the Tucson Art Museum; the Colorado Springs Fine Arts Center; the New Mexico Farm and Ranch Heritage Museum; and the National Cowboy and Western Heritage Museum.

He is still an active artist.

Further reading

References

External links 
 Personal Facebook  *

1935 births
Living people
Lake Forest College alumni
University of Illinois Urbana-Champaign alumni
School of the Art Institute of Chicago alumni
People from Champaign, Illinois
American artists